Wallace may refer to:

People
 Clan Wallace in Scotland
 Wallace (given name)
 Wallace (surname)
 Wallace (footballer, born 1986), full name Wallace Fernando Pereira, Brazilian football left-back
 Wallace (footballer, born 1987), full name Wallace Reis da Silva, Brazilian football centre-back
 Wallace (footballer, born May 1994), full name Wallace Oliveira dos Santos, Brazilian football full-back
 Wallace (footballer, born October 1994), full name Wallace Fortuna dos Santos, Brazilian football centre-back
 Wallace (footballer, born 1998), full name Wallace Menezes dos Santos, Brazilian football midfielder

Fictional characters
 Wallace, from Wallace and Gromit
 Wallace, from the Pokémon franchise
 Wallace, from Sin City
 Wallace, from The Wire
 Wallace, from The Hangover Part III
 Wallace the Brave, the titular character of the comic strip
 Wallace, from Leave It To Beaver
 Wallace Breen, from Half-Life 2
 Wallace Fennel, from Veronica Mars
 Wallace Footrot, from Footrot Flats
 Wallace West, from DC Comics
 Eli Wallace, from Stargate Universe

Places

Canada
 Wallace, Nova Scotia, a rural community
 Wallace Ridge, Nova Scotia
 Wallace, Ontario, a rural community
 Rural Municipality of Wallace No. 243, Saskatchewan

United States
 Wallace House (disambiguation), several historic structures
 Wallace, California, census-designated place
 Wallace, Harrison County, West Virginia, census-designated place
 Wallace, Idaho, city
 Wallace, Indiana, town
 Wallace, Kansas, city
 Wallace, Louisiana, census-designated place
 Wallace, Menominee County, Michigan, community in Michigan's Upper Peninsula
 Wallace, Alcona County, Michigan
 Wallace, Missouri, an unincorporated community
 Wallace, Nebraska, village
 Wallace, North Carolina, town
 Wallace, South Carolina, unincorporated community
 Wallace, South Dakota, town
 Wallace Ridge, Louisiana, census-designated place

Other places
 Wallace (lunar crater)
 Wallace (Martian crater)
 Wallace, Victoria, a town in Australia
 Wallace Air Station, Luzon, Philippines
 Wallace Collection, a museum in London
 Wallace Creek, a river in Texas
 Wallace Line, a faunal boundary line dividing the ecologies of Asia and Australia
 Wallace Monument, Stirling, Scotland
 Cape Wallace, South Shetland Islands, Antarctica

Other uses
 Wallace v. Jaffree, 1985 US Supreme Court case
 Wallace (New Zealand electorate), a former New Zealand parliamentary electorate
 Wallace fountain, public drinking fountains in Paris
 Wallace tree, hardware implementation of digital circuit that multiplies two integers
 The Wallace and Ladmo Show, children's television program
 Westland Wallace, a British inter-war biplane
 Wallace (currently Wallace VI), St. Bernard mascot of The Canadian Scottish Regiment (Princess Mary's)
 Wallace, Fujian Food Co., owner of CNHLS, a fast food chain in China
 HMS Wallace, the original name of HMAS Vampire (D68)
 Wallace (pitbull)
 Wallace Oak (disambiguation), several trees named for William Wallace

See also
 Wallis (disambiguation)
 The Wallace (disambiguation)
 Justice Wallace (disambiguation)